David Bianco is the name of:

David Bianco (educator) (1939–2016), American educator
David Bianco (producer) (1954–2018), American music producer